The M38 Wolfhound was a 6×6 US armored car produced in 1944 by the Chevrolet division of General Motors. It was designed as a replacement for the M8 Greyhound series, but the end of the war in 1945 led to the cancellation of the project after the completion of a handful of prototype vehicles.

Specifications
The Wolfhound had a crew of four and was armed with a 37 mm gun in a rotating open-topped turret, with an ammunition load of 93 rounds. Its secondary armament consisted of two machine guns; one mounted co-axially with the main weapon, the other on an AA pintle mounting. It was powered by a Cadillac, eight-cylinder, water-cooled engine. Each side featured three large tires on symmetrically placed axles, with distinctive curved mudguards. The frontal glacis plate was sharply sloped to improve protection. A radio antenna was mounted on the front right of the glacis.

Development history

One M38 was modified to take the turret of an M24 Chaffee tank and went through a series of tests to check a possibility of upgunning the vehicle. The layout of the M38 had similarities with the Alvis Saladin, a post-war British armored car, but there was no link between them.

Gallery

See also
 M-numbers

References
Citations

Bibliography
 "T28/M38 Wolfhound 6x6 Armored Car" warwheels.net
 Davis, Michael W.J (2012). Chevrolet 1911-1960. Arcadia Publishing. 
 
 Icks, Robert J, U.S. Armoured Cars  AFV Weapons Profile No. 40, Profile Publishing

External links

World War II vehicles

Abandoned military projects of the United States
Armoured cars of the United States
World War II armored fighting vehicles of the United States
World War II armoured cars